The Congress of Campeche is the legislature of Campeche, a state of Mexico. The Congress is unicameral. The legislature was established on 2 March 1861.

Electoral system
There are 35 seats, 21 deputies are elected with first-past-the-post in single-member districts and 14 are elected through proportional representation. The chamber is renewed every three years.

Authority
The authority of the Congress is stated in Chapter XI, Article 29 of the Political Constitution of the State of Campeche.

See also
List of Mexican state congresses
 Governor of Campeche

References

Government of Campeche
Campeche
Campeche